Hans Otfried von Linstow, (16 March 1899 – 30 August 1944) was a German Army colonel. He took part in the 20 July Plot to assassinate Adolf Hitler.

Early life
Born in Berlin, von Linstow joined the German military, Reichswehr, after the First World War.

World War II
He served in several units, in 1939 with 15th infantry division and 1940 with the 10th army corps, in 1941 with the 9th army corps in Russia. In April 1944, he was dispatched to Paris, France, as Chief of Staff under the authority of Carl-Heinrich von Stülpnagel.

Participation in the plot to kill Hitler and his execution
It was not until the actual day of the 20 July Plot in 1944, that Stülpnagel included von Linstow in his plans. Von Linstow promptly rounded up most SS, SD and Gestapo officers in Paris and imprisoned them. Claus Schenk Graf von Stauffenberg called him later to inform him that Berlin was lost. Von Linstow was arrested three days later on 23 July in Paris. Sentenced to death in Berlin by Roland Freisler, president of the People's Court on 30 August, he was executed that same day in Berlin-Plötzensee.

References

1899 births
1944 deaths
German Army officers of World War II
People from the Province of Saxony
People executed by hanging at Plötzensee Prison
Executed members of the 20 July plot
People from Saxony-Anhalt executed at Plötzensee Prison
People from Wittenberg
Military personnel from Saxony-Anhalt